Giuseppe Gobbato (28 May 1904 - date of death unknown) was an Italian racewalker who competed at the 1936 Summer Olympics.

National titles
Italian Athletics Championships
50 km walk: 1937

References

External links
 

1904 births
Date of death unknown
Athletes (track and field) at the 1936 Summer Olympics
Italian male racewalkers
Olympic athletes of Italy
20th-century Italian people